Clément Loret (10 October 1833 – 14 February 1909) was an organist, music educator, and composer of Belgian origin, French naturalized.

Biography 
Clément Loret was born in Dendermonde (Termonde) in Belgium. His father Hippolyte, organist (at Notre-Dame de Termonde) and organ builder, introduced him to music and the organ at a very young age. He started playing in church when he was 7 years old, and the following year he occasionally replaced his father at the keyboard. In 1846, his father was appointed organist at Mons, and the young Clément continued his musical studies with Jules Denefve (1814–1877).

Admitted to the Royal Conservatory of Brussels in 1851, he was a student of Lemmens for the organ and Fétis for the counterpoint. He won a First Prize in 1853.

In 1855, Loret came to Paris. Lemmens had written him a letter of introduction to Aristide Cavaillé-Coll, who was so little impressed by the young man that he dared not present him to his acquaintances. He then held organist positions at Suresnes and Notre-Dame des Victoires.

Appointed professor of organ at the Niedermeyer school of Paris in 1858, he trained most of the French organists of the time including Fauré, Letocart and Gigout.

His brother Charles, who died young, was also a musician and composer. His wife, Philippine Colonius, was a talented musician.

Their son, Victor Loret (1 September 1859 – 3 February 1946) was a musician, musicologist and a very famous French Egyptologist. A friend of Camille Saint-Saëns, he was interested in music and instruments from the Pharaonic period. As ethnomusicologist, he transcribed traditional melodies and dances from the south of the valley.

Clément Loret died in Colombes, near Paris, on 14 February 1909,

Works 
Several of his works have been published in Paris by Loret Fils & H. Freytag, his publishing house.

Organ 
 50 Pièces d’orgue pour messes et vêpres, Régnier-Canaux, Paris
 24 Morceaux pour orgue sans pédale, Régnier-Canaux, Paris
 Le Service divin, 6 Entrées, 6 Offertoires, 6 Élévations, 6 Communions, 6 Sorties, morceaux faciles, Heugel, Paris (1899)
 Première Sonate in B flat minor for organ, Op. 25 (1889)
 Offertoire pour Pâques on O Filii et filiœ
 Postlude "Alleluia!" in E flat major for organ
 Fantaisie pastorale
 8 Morceaux d'orgue expressif : 1. Rêverie (Mazurka) - 2. Absence - 3. Pastorale - 4. Mélancolie - 5. Prise de voile - 6. Boléro - 7. Rêverie - 8. Romance sans paroles (Les Concerts de famille)
 Bénédiction nuptiale in L major.
 Pièce à double expression en forme de canon
 Variations sur des noëls for organ (1890)
 6 Concertos pour orgue et orchestre de G. F. Hændel, (Op. 4) arranged for organ only, with fermatas (cadences)
 6 Concertos pour orgue et orchestre de G. F. Hændel, (Op. 7) arranged for organ only, with fermatas (cadences)
 Cours d’orgue Op. 19: I. Orgue sans pédale, II. Orgue avec pédale, III. Les combinaisons sur les orgues modernes et l’improvisation, IV. Le plain-chant et son accompagnement. (1858–80)
 Exercices d’orgue, 3 issues, in La Maîtrise, Paris, 1859
 24 Études pour orgue, 12 without pedal, 12 with pédal, Heugel, Paris
 Pièces de genre : Sur les ondes – La Flûte enchantée (Mozart) – Enivrement – Cantilène – Souvenir – Les pifferari – Alceste (Gluck)

Twelve Pieces for Organ (1898) 
1. Allegro maestoso in G minor
2. Prière in E flat major
3. Chacone in B flat major
4. Offertoire in D major
5. Prélude et fugue in B flat major
6. Pièce légère in G major
7. Grand-Chœur in B flat major
8. Élévation in E flat major
9. Scherzo in B minor
10. Communion in L major
11. Cantilène in F major
12. Final in D minor

Six Pieces for Organ (v. 1900) 
 Marche nuptiale in B flat major, Op. 40
 Cantabile in B minor, Op. 41
 Prière in D flat major, Op. 42
 Andante religioso in G major, Op. 43
 Canzone in B minor, Op. 44
 Scherzo-Fanfare in G major, Op. 45

Others 
 12 Morceaux for harmonium
 12 Morceaux for harmonium and piano
 Deuxième nocturne, for piano and organ
 Boléro, for piano and organ
 Symphonie in D for large orchestra (unpublished)
 Le Calvaire, oratorio (unpublished)
 Concerto for piano and orchestra (unpublished)

Mélodies 
Glisse ô ma barque (barcarolle) - Les deux captifs - Dis-moi je t’aime - Dormez (sérénade) - L’enfant de la négresse - La fleur - L’oreiller d’un enfant - Rêver, prier, aimer - L’été - Oui, c’est toi que j’aime (chez l’auteur à Paris)

Piano 
 Studies
 12 Morceaux pour piano : 1. Marche Nuptiale - 2. Menuet - 3. Romance sans Paroles - 4. Rosée de Printemps (mazurka) - 5. Scherzo - 6. Rêverie-Nocturne - 7. Rondo - 8. Pluie dans le Lac - 9. Andantino - 10. Dors mon Enfant - 11. Caprice-Mazurka - 12. Valse Tyrolienne, chez l’auteur à Paris, s.d.
 Préludes and fugues
 Romances sans paroles

Recordings 
A selection of works for organ by Clément Loret has been recorded on the Cavaillé-Coll organs at Pezenas and Carcassonne by Jean-Luc Salique (2 CD Coriolan, 1998).

References

Sources 
 F.-J. Fétis, Biographie Universelle des musiciens, Supplément et complément, t. 2, Paris, Librairie de Firmin Didot, 1880. 
 Jean-Claude Goyon, Victor Loret, Dictionnaire critique des historiens de l’art, INHA (Institut National de l’Histoire de l’Art)
 Orpha Ochse, Organists and Organ Playing in Nineteenth-Century France and Belgium, Bloomington, Indiana University Press, 1994.

External links 
 Clément Loret on Musicalics

 Sibley Library Partition des 6 Concertos de Hændel Op. 4, arr. by Loret.
 Sibley Library Partition des 6 Concertos de Hændel Op. 7, arr. by Loret.
 Étude no.9 Allegretto in D minor from the Cours d'Orgue, vol. 2; Willem van Twillert
 Scherzo en si mineur, No 9 of the Douze Pièces for organ, by Willem van Twillert

French classical organists
French male organists
French composers of sacred music
Royal Conservatory of Brussels alumni
French music educators
1833 births
People from Dendermonde
1909 deaths
19th-century French male musicians
Male classical organists
19th-century organists